DVB-T, short for Digital Video Broadcasting – Terrestrial, is the DVB European-based consortium standard for the broadcast transmission of digital terrestrial television that was first published in 1997 and first broadcast in Singapore in February, 1998.  This system transmits compressed digital audio, digital video and other data in an MPEG transport stream, using coded orthogonal frequency-division multiplexing (COFDM or OFDM) modulation. It is also the format widely used worldwide (including North America) for Electronic News Gathering for transmission of video and audio from a mobile newsgathering vehicle to a central receive point.
It is also used in the US by Amateur television operators.

Basics
Rather than carrying one data carrier on a single radio frequency (RF) channel, COFDM works by splitting the digital data stream into a large number of slower digital streams, each of which digitally modulates a set of closely spaced adjacent sub-carrier frequencies. In the case of DVB-T, there are two choices for the number of carriers known as 2K-mode or 8K-mode. These are actually 1,705 or 6,817 sub-carriers that are approximately 4 kHz or 1 kHz apart.

DVB-T offers three different modulation schemes (QPSK, 16QAM, 64QAM).

DVB-T has been adopted or proposed for digital television broadcasting by many countries (see map), using mainly VHF 7 MHz and UHF 8 MHz channels whereas Taiwan, Colombia, Panama and Trinidad and Tobago use 6 MHz channels. Examples include the UK's Freeview.

The DVB-T Standard is published as EN 300 744, Framing structure, channel coding and modulation for digital terrestrial television. This is available from the ETSI website, as is ETSI TS 101 154, Specification for the use of Video and Audio Coding in Broadcasting Applications based on the MPEG-2 Transport Stream, which gives details of the DVB use of source coding methods for MPEG-2 and, more recently, H.264/MPEG-4 AVC as well as audio encoding systems. Many countries that have adopted DVB-T have published standards for their implementation. These include the D-book in the UK, the Italian DGTVi, the ETSI E-Book and the Nordic countries and Ireland NorDig.

DVB-T has been further developed into newer standards such as DVB-H (Handheld), which was a commercial failure and is no longer in operation, and DVB-T2, which was initially finalised in August 2011.

DVB-T as a digital transmission delivers data in a series of discrete blocks at the symbol rate. DVB-T is a COFDM transmission technique which includes the use of a Guard Interval. It allows the receiver to cope with strong multipath situations. Within a geographical area, DVB-T also allows single-frequency network (SFN) operation, where two or more transmitters carrying the same data operate on the same frequency. In such cases the signals from each transmitter in the SFN needs to be accurately time-aligned, which is done by sync information in the stream and timing at each transmitter referenced to GPS.

The length of the Guard Interval can be chosen. It is a trade-off between data rate and SFN capability. The longer the guard interval the larger is the potential SFN area without creating intersymbol interference (ISI).
It is possible to operate SFNs which do not fulfill the guard interval condition if the self-interference is properly planned and monitored.

Technical description of a DVB-T transmitter

With reference to the figure, a short description of the signal processing blocks follows.

 Source coding and MPEG-2 multiplexing (MUX): Compressed video, compressed audio, and data streams are multiplexed into MPEG program streams (MPEG-PSs). One or more MPEG-PSs are joined together into an MPEG transport stream (MPEG-TS); this is the basic digital stream which is being transmitted and received by TV sets or home Set Top Boxes (STB). Allowed bit rates for the transported data depend on a number of coding and modulation parameters: it can range from about 5 to about 32 Mbit/s (see the bottom figure for a complete listing).
 Splitter: Two different MPEG-TSs can be transmitted at the same time, using a technique called Hierarchical Transmission. It may be used to transmit, for example a standard definition SDTV signal and a high definition HDTV signal on the same carrier. Generally, the SDTV signal is more robust than the HDTV one. At the receiver, depending on the quality of the received signal, the STB may be able to decode the HDTV stream or, if signal strength lacks, it can switch to the SDTV one (in this way, all receivers that are in proximity of the transmission site can lock the HDTV signal, whereas all the other ones, even the farthest, may still be able to receive and decode an SDTV signal).
 MUX adaptation and energy dispersal: The MPEG-TS is identified as a sequence of data packets, of fixed length (188 bytes). With a technique called energy dispersal, the byte sequence is decorrelated.
 External encoder: A first level of error correction is applied to the transmitted data, using a non-binary block code, a Reed–Solomon RS (204, 188) code, allowing the correction of up to a maximum of 8 wrong bytes for each 188-byte packet.
 External interleaver: Convolutional interleaving is used to rearrange the transmitted data sequence, in such a way that it becomes more rugged to long sequences of errors.
 Internal encoder: A second level of error correction is given by a punctured convolutional code, which is often denoted in STBs menus as FEC (Forward error correction). There are five valid coding rates: 1/2, 2/3, 3/4, 5/6, and 7/8.
 Internal interleaver: Data sequence is rearranged again, aiming to reduce the influence of burst errors. This time, a block interleaving technique is adopted, with a pseudo-random assignment scheme (this is really done by two separate interleaving processes, one operating on bits and another one operating on groups of bits).
 Mapper: The digital bit sequence is mapped into a base band modulated sequence of complex symbols. There are three valid modulation schemes: QPSK, 16-QAM, 64-QAM.
 Frame adaptation: the complex symbols are grouped in blocks of constant length (1512, 3024, or 6048 symbols per block). A frame is generated, 68 blocks long, and a superframe is built by 4 frames.
 Pilot and TPS signals: In order to simplify the reception of the signal being transmitted on the terrestrial radio channel, additional signals are inserted in each block. Pilot signals are used during the synchronization and equalization phase, while TPS signals (Transmission Parameters Signalling) send the parameters of the transmitted signal and to unequivocally identify the transmission cell. The receiver must be able to synchronize, equalize, and decode the signal to gain access to the information held by the TPS pilots. Thus, the receiver must know this information beforehand, and the TPS data is only used in special cases, such as changes in the parameters, resynchronizations, etc.

 OFDM modulation: The sequence of blocks is modulated according to the OFDM technique, using 1705 or 6817 carriers (2k or 8k mode, respectively). Increasing the number of carriers does not modify the payload bit rate, which remains constant.
 Guard interval insertion: to decrease receiver complexity, every OFDM block is extended, copying in front of it its own end (cyclic prefix). The width of such guard interval can be 1/32, 1/16, 1/8, or 1/4 that of the original block length. Cyclic prefix is required to operate single frequency networks, where there may exist an ineliminable interference coming from several sites transmitting the same program on the same carrier frequency.
 DAC and front-end: The digital signal is transformed into an analogue signal, with a digital-to-analog converter (DAC), and then modulated to radio frequency (VHF, UHF) by the RF front end. The occupied bandwidth is designed to accommodate each single DVB-T signal into 5, 6, 7, or 8 MHz wide channels. The base band sample rate provided at the DAC input depends on the channel bandwidth: it is   samples/s, where  is the channel bandwidth expressed in Hz.

Technical description of the receiver
The receiving STB adopts techniques which are dual to those ones used in the transmission.

 Front-end and ADC: the analogue RF signal is converted to base-band and transformed into a digital signal, using an analogue-to-digital converter (ADC).
 Time and frequency synchronization: the digital base band signal is searched to identify the beginning of frames and blocks. Any problems with the frequency of the components of the signal are corrected, too. The property that the guard interval at the end of the symbol is placed also at the beginning is exploited to find the beginning of a new OFDM symbol. On the other hand, continual pilots (whose value and position is determined in the standard and thus known by the receiver) determine the frequency offset suffered by the signal. This frequency offset might have been caused by Doppler effect, inaccuracies in either the transmitter or receiver clock, and so on. Generally, synchronization is done in two steps, either before or after the FFT, in such way to resolve both coarse and fine frequency/timing errors. Pre-FFT steps involve the use of sliding correlation on the received time signal, whereas Post-FFT steps use correlation between the frequency signal and the pilot carriers sequence.
 Guard interval disposal: the cyclic prefix is removed.
 OFDM demodulation: this is achieved with an FFT.
 Frequency equalization: the pilot signals are used to estimate the Channel Transfer Function (CTF) every three subcarriers. The CTF is derived in the remaining subcarriers via interpolation. The CTF is then used to equalize the received data in each subcarrier, generally using a Zero-Forcing method (multiplication by CTF inverse). The CTF is also used to weigh the reliability of the demapped data when they are provided to the Viterbi decoder. 
 Demapping: since there are Gray-encoded QAM constellations, demapping is done in a "soft" way using nonlinear laws that demap each bit in the received symbol to a more or less reliable fuzzy value between -1 and +1.
 Internal deinterleaving
 Internal decoding: uses the Viterbi algorithm, with a traceback length larger than that generally used for the basic 1/2 rate code, due to the presence of punctured ("erased") bits.
 External deinterleaving
 External decoding
 MUX adaptation
 MPEG-2 demultiplexing and source decoding

Countries and territories using DVB-T or DVB-T2

Americas

  (decided on 10 July 2007)
  (decided on 28 August 2008) (Uses DVB-T/H.264/MPEG-4 for SD and HD since 2011)
  (Nuuk TV)
 
  (decided on 12 May 2009) (uses DVB-T/MPEG-2 for SD and DVB-T/H.264/MPEG-4 for HD transmissions.)
 
  (In 2008 KTV Ltd. implemented DVB-T, 64QAM, 7/8, 1/32, MPEG2 for both SD and HD transmissions)

Europe

  (uses MPEG-2 for SD and H.264/MPEG-4 AVC for HD transmissions).
 
 
  (transition to DVB-T2)
 
  (uses DVB-T MPEG-2 and DVB-T2 H.264/MPEG-4 AVC)
  (uses DVB-T H.264/MPEG-4 AVC for SD and HD transmission and DVB-T2 for pay SD and HD transmissions)
  (H.264/MPEG-4 AVC, FEC=2/3, guard interval – 1/4, 64 QAM. Official simulcast started in March 2013, full switch has been done on 30 September 2013.)
  From 2020 the transmission is on DVB-T2 H.265/HEVC with HD 1080p50 – see Television in Croatia
  (MPEG-2, DVB-T2 HEVC H.265 started in 2017)
  (H.264/MPEG-4 AVC video)
  (uses H.264/AVC for SD and HD transmissions. See DVB-T in Denmark.)
  (uses H.264/AVC video)
 
 
  (uses H.264/AVC for free HD, pay SD and pay HD transmissions. See Digital terrestrial television#France.)
  (partly still DVB-T MPEG-2, SD only; since 2016 transition to DVB-T2 H.265/HEVC with HD 1080p50 – see Television in Germany)
  
  Both providers Digea and ERT  use H.264/MPEG-4 AVC)
  (branded MinDigTV, uses H.264/MPEG-4 AVC video exclusively.)
 
  (uses H.264/MPEG-4 AVC for HD and SD transmissions, see Saorview)
  (uses MPEG-2 for SD, H.264/MPEG-4 AVC for HD). Transition to DVB-T2 scheduled in 2022.
  (uses H.264/MPEG-4 AVC)
  (uses H.264/MPEG-4 AVC)
  (uses DVB-T MPEG-2 for SD and H.264/MPEG-4 AVC for HD)
  (DVB-T in Macedonia)
 
  (uses MPEG-2. H.264/AVC is being tested.)
 
  (uses DVB-T2, operated by Digitenne)
  (uses H.264/MPEG-4 AVC for SD and HD transmissions)
  (uses H.264/AVC video for SD and HD transmissions; see DVB-T in Poland)
  (uses H.264/AVC video;)
  DVB-T was only used experimentally in two cities, and is being phased out. The official terrestrial broadcasting standard in Romania is DVB-T2, and implementations started in 2015.
  (uses DVB-T2 H.264/AVC)
  (uses DVB-T2 H.264/AVC)
  (uses MPEG-2 for SD and H.264/MPEG-4 AVC for HD, testing DVB-T2 H.264/AVC)
  (uses H.264/MPEG-4 AVC video since 2007. See DVB-T in Slovenia)
   (uses DVB-T MPEG-2 for SD and DVB-T H.264/MPEG-4 for HD transmissions.)
  (uses MPEG-2 and H.264/MPEG-4 AVC) for SD, and DVB-T2 with H.264/AVC for SD and HD transmissions. See DVB-T in Sweden.)
  (one regional DVB-T station remaining. Terrestrial national TV broadcasting restored using DVB-T2 near Austria, soon near France)
  (Not officially rolled out. Last known DVB-T2 test broadcasting TRT 4K ended on 1 June 2017)
  (uses DVB-T MPEG-2 for SD and DVB-T2 H.264/AVC for HD transmissions. See DVB-T in United Kingdom.)
  (uses DVB-T2 H.264/AVC for all nationwide broadcasts)

Oceania

  (mostly uses MPEG-2 for SD transmissions and H.264/AVC for HD transmissions, refer to this list of digital television channels in Australia)
  (uses MPEG-4/H.264 video; see Freeview New Zealand)

Asia

  (uses DVB-T2 MPEG-4 launched April 2015)
  (in assessment)
  (Announced)
  (uses DVB-T2)
  (uses MPEG-2 for SD and MPEG-4 for HD transmissions)
  (adopted DVB-T2 H.264/AVC on 2 February 2012)
  (uses DVB-T MPEG-4/H.264/AAC SD :720x576i HD :1920x1080i); since 2020 transition to DVB-T2 H.265/HEVC with HD 1080p50 – see Television in Iran)
  (started in Kurdistan region-Iraq by MIX Media 31 December 2011 uses MPEG-4)
  (uses MPEG-4/H.264 video)
 
  (will use DVB-T2)
  (DVB-T2)
 
  (7 DVB-T channels across 2 transponders during trial, final system uses DVB-T2 nationwide, 17 TV channels and 14 radio channels across 2 transponders in UHF, analog shutdown on 31 Oct 2019. Uses H.264 video and AAC audio)
  (uses DVB-T2)
 
  (uses DVB-T2, trial began on 2012)
  (in assessment)
  (in assessment)
 
  (4 DVB-T Channels on 1 January 2007 and 7 DVB-T2 Channels on 13 December 2013)
 
  (using DVB-T, MPEG-2 and MPEG-4.)
  (uses DVB-T/MPEG-2 for SD and DVB-T/H.264/MPEG-4 for HD transmissions)
  (DVB-T2)
  (uses DVB-T2 H.264/AVC with HE-AAC codec for both SD and HD transmissions launched on April 1, 2014)

Africa

 
 
 
 
 
 
 
  (Experimental DTMB)
 
 
 
 
 
 
 
 
  (Will use DVB-T2MPEG-4)
 
  (use DVB-T2 on paid network)
 
 
 
 
 
 
 
 
 
  (is already using DVB-T/MPEG-4 and will soon migrate to DVB-T2)
 
 
 
 
   (will use DVB-T2, after briefly considering ISDB-T)
 
 
 
 
  (experimental)

DTT switch-off

While many countries have expected a shift to digital terrestrial television, a few have moved in the opposite direction following unsuccessful trials.

 Switzerland : Swiss public broadcaster SRG terminated DTT network on 3 June 2019. A regional station from the Geneva area has kept broadcasting. A DVB-T2 antenna was later activated in the east of the country to relay Swiss TV to Austrian cable operators. A similar broadcast is planned to cover Grand Geneva. 
 Turkey terminated DTT network on 1 June 2017.

See also

 ATSC (Advanced Television Systems Committee, North American Standard)
 Digital Audio Broadcasting (low bit rate video suitable for moving receivers)
 Digital Video Broadcasting (technical standards underpinning DVB-T)
 DTV channel protection ratios
 DVB over IP
 DVB-T2
 Digital terrestrial television
 DMB-T – Digital Multimedia Broadcast-Terrestrial
 Interactive television
 ISDB – Integrated Services Digital Broadcasting
 ISDB-T International
 Multimedia Home Platform (standard to deliver interactive TV applications over DVB)
 OFDM system comparison table
 Personal video recorder
 Spectral efficiency comparison table
 Teletext

Notes

References
 ETSI Standard: EN 300 744 V1.5.1, Digital Video Broadcasting (DVB); Framing structure, channel coding and modulation for digital terrestrial television, available at ETSI Publications Download Area (This will open ETSI document search engine, to find the latest version of the document enter a search string; free registration is required to download PDF.)

External links

 Website of the DVB Project
 Official factsheet of DVB-T 
 DigiTAG website

Digital Video Broadcasting
Television transmission standards
Video formats